Victoria Burgoyne (born 3 April 1953) is an English actress.

She is known for being a guest actress in the infamously uncompleted 1979 Doctor Who serial Shada, the making of which was abandoned as the result of a BBC strike. She provided her voice to complete the serial using animation in 2017. Burgoyne was a regular cast member on the series Howards' Way as Vicki Rockwell during its 1989 series.

Other TV credits include: Doctors Daughters, where she was one of the leads, The Professionals, Give Us a Break and Ever Decreasing Circles.

Her film credits include Mr Smith (1976), Secrets of a Door-to-Door Salesman (1973), Death Ship (1980), Where Is Parsifal? (1984), and a role as a prostitute in the costume drama Stealing Heaven (1988).

Filmography

External links
 

1953 births
English television actresses
Living people
Actresses from London